The MapArt Publishing Corporation is a Canadian cartography publisher founded in 1981 by Peter Heiler Ltd. that produces and prints yearly editions of maps for Canada and the United States. Headquartered in Oshawa, Ontario, MapArt is Canada's leading map publisher, producing more Canadian titles than any of its competitors and all settlements with a population over 5000 in Canada are covered in various editions. Its signature yellow cover is seen throughout the country at filling stations, convenience stores, and general merchandising stores. MapArt Publishing grouped up with Rand McNally Maps and JDMGEO Maps, to create CCC Maps in 2013 but returned to publish under the MapArt banner in 2014.

References

External links
 Official home of MapArt Publishing Corporation 
MapArt's corporate website
MapArt's exclusive Distributor in Canada
MapMobility, One of MapArt's former cartographic developers
Online interactive MapArt-style Golden Horseshoe map by MapMobility

Publishing companies of Canada
Map publishing companies
Publishing companies established in 1981
1981 establishments in Ontario
Companies based in Oshawa